Willibald Hentschel (7 November 1858 in Łódź – 2 February 1947 in Berg, Upper Bavaria) was a German agrarian and volkisch writer and political activist. He sought to renew the Aryan race through a variety of schemes, including selective breeding and polygamy, all within a firmly rural setting.

Early political activity
A student of biology at the University of Jena, Henstchel studied for his doctorate under celebrated Darwinist Ernst Haeckel. He used his knowledge to patent an indigo dye from which he earned a fortune that enabled him to concentrate his efforts on political ventures. Amongst his earliest activities was his place on the board of directors of the German Social Party, an anti-Semitic group led by Max Liebermann von Sonnenberg in the 1890s. His 1901 book Varuna, in which he explored the supposed origins of the Aryan race, helped to make him a popular figure on the far right. In this book he argued that history was driven by the process of racial purification and the energy and spirit that drove this desire. Hentschel was close to Theodor Fritsch and with him founded the anti-Semitic journal Hammer in 1903. Fritsch announced that Varuna, which complained that Germans were becoming "Semitized" through such initiatives as democratisation and rural depopulation, was the ideological basis of the new journal.

Mittgart
In 1904 he published the book Mittgart in which he outlined a scheme to send 1000 ethnically pure women and 100 men picked for their military and athletic prowess to large country estates to procreate. Their children would then leave the estates at the age of 16 with the aim of travelling Germany and renewing racial stock. He further argued that in time the countryside would be the only place were pure Germans would be found, with the cities housing the biologically unfit who would die away quickly. Hentschel's scheme attracted criticism not only from religious leaders but also from fellow racial nationalists who were outraged by what they saw as an attack on the institution of the family. Hentschel for his part was an atheist and belonged to the tendency within German nationalism that was strongly opposed to Christianity. Despite the criticism he founded his own Mittgart-Bund to publicise his idea and even attempted to start his colony in Lower Saxony although this scheme met with little success and had been abandoned before 1914.

Interbellum
After World War I he moderated his ideas somewhat, calling instead for a migration of ethnic Germans into the east of the country in order to displace the Poles living there. Hentschel called for these Germans to be Artamanen, a portmanteau word he created from art and manen, Middle High German words meaning 'agriculture man' and indicating his desire for a retreat from urban life to an idyllic rural past. His vision inspired the creation of the Artaman League youth movement in which the likes of Heinrich Himmler and Richard Walther Darré were active.

Hentschel joined the Nazi Party (as member number 144,649) on 1 August 1929 although, whilst his ideas about eugenics were influential on Nazism as an ideology, he had no real influence in the party personally.

See also
Varuna

References

1858 births
1947 deaths
Writers from Łódź
People from Warsaw Governorate
German atheists
German Social Party (German Empire) politicians
Nazi Party members
German eugenicists
University of Jena alumni